Nemanja Stojanović (born 9 April 1987) is a Serbian football midfielder who played for Sloboda Užice in Serbian First League.

Honours
Mladost
 Serbian First League: 2013–14

References

External links
 
 Nemanja Stojanović stats at utakmica.rs 
 

1987 births
Living people
Sportspeople from Užice
Association football midfielders
Serbian footballers
FK Mladost Lučani players
FK Sloboda Užice players
Serbian SuperLiga players